Couchmaster is an album released in 1995 by New Zealand band The Bats. It was their last studio album release for ten years.

"Afternoon in Bed" was released as a CD single that included three additional non-album tracks.

Track listing

Personnel
Malcolm Grant - drums, percussion
Paul Kean - bass, guitar, backing vocals, ukulele
Robert Scott - vocals, guitar, keyboards
Kaye Woodward - guitar, vocals

Also credited:
Crispin Vinnell - French horn
Arnie Van Bussel - engineer

References

The Bats (New Zealand band) albums
1995 albums
Flying Nun Records albums
Dunedin Sound albums